Acleris gothena is a species of moth of the family Tortricidae. It is found in Nepal.

The wingspan is about 26 mm. The ground colour of the forewings is white with three basal spots, costal and terminal spots. The subtornal spots and edges of the costal blotch are black. The costal blotch is greyish and ferruginous inside. The hindwings are transparent brownish grey.

References

Moths described in 2012
gothena
Moths of Asia